V is the debut studio album by Australian electropop group Van She, released on 9 August 2008 by Modular Recordings. After writing a bulk of the songs from a small farm house south of Sydney, in early 2007 the band packed for the UK, where they recorded the album with UK producer Jim Abbiss, whose previous work includes production for Placebo, Arctic Monkeys and Massive Attack.

Track listing
 "Memory Man" – 3:31
 "Cat & the Eye" – 4:02
 "Changes" – 3:30
 "Strangers" – 3:35
 "It Could Be the Same" – 4:35
 "The Sea" – 5:18
 "Virgin Suicide" – 4:22
 "Temps Mort" – 1:16
 "Talkin'" – 3:33
 "Kelly" – 4:54
 "So High" – 4:40
 "A Sharp Knife" – 4:16

Charts

Tours
Cat & The Eye Tour (February 2008)
Van She Party (July - August 2008)
Club Mod Tour (August 2008)
'V' Album Launch Tour (September 2008)

References

2008 debut albums
Albums produced by Jim Abbiss
Modular Recordings albums
Van She albums

de:Van She